Harry T. Gast, Jr. (September 19, 1920 – July 30, 2015) was a Republican politician from Michigan who served in both houses of the Michigan Legislature and in various local offices between the mid-1950s and 2002. During his final 18 years in the Senate, Gast chaired the appropriations committee.

Gast's first elected office was as treasurer of Lincoln Township, an office he held for 18 years. He then became township supervisor for eight years before running for the Michigan House of Representatives. He also served as a member and president of the Evans School board.

A portion of M-63 in Berrien County was named the "Harry Gast Parkway" in 2008, and the Senate Appropriations Committee room in the Michigan State Capitol was named in his honor in 2015.

Gast died on July 30, 2015, aged 94.

References

1920 births
2015 deaths
School board members in Michigan
Republican Party members of the Michigan House of Representatives
Republican Party Michigan state senators
People from St. Joseph, Michigan
Michigan State University alumni
Farmers from Michigan
20th-century American politicians
21st-century American politicians